The Borough of Middlesbrough is a borough with unitary authority status in North Yorkshire, England, based around the town of Middlesbrough in the north of the county. It is in the Tees Valley mayoralty along with Stockton-on-Tees, Redcar and Cleveland, Hartlepool and Darlington boroughs. Nunthorpe along with Stainton and Thornton have statutory parish councils.

History

From the county's creation in 1889 (from the historic subdivision of Yorkshire) areas under Middlesbrough's governance remained part of North Riding of Yorkshire county for varing amounts of self-governance. The final iteration of this governance was reconstituted as a non-metropolitan district in the county of Cleveland (the county itself governed from Middlesbrough) in 1974. Since 1996, for ceremonial purposes, the district is part of North Yorkshire as a unitary authority. Fire and Police, however, remain as well as the borough's placement in North East England instead of Yorkshire and the Humber, which large parts of North Yorkshire is in. It is included within the combined authority area of Tees Valley for strategic purposes.

Areas of the borough
The borough contains the following areas:

Acklam
Ayresome
Berwick Hills
Brambles Farm
Coulby Newham
Easterside
Grove Hill
Hemlington
Linthorpe
Middlehaven
Nunthorpe
Ormesby
Pallister
Stainton
Saltersgill
Thornton
Thorntree
Tollesby
Whinney Banks

Structure
The borough is made up of 19 council wards (formerly 21 as Gresham ward merged with Newport ward between the 2011 and 2021 censuses) within the borough of Middlesbrough. Each ward has a non-statutory community committee. There are also two statutory parish councils for "Nunthorpe" and "Stainton and Thornton". East, north and west Middlesbrough as well as parts of Park End-and-Beckfield, Berwick-Hils-and-Pallister and Ladgate are covered by the Middlesbrough parliamentary constituency. South Middlesbrough as well as the other parts of the  wards are covered by the Middlesbrough South and East Cleveland parliamentary constituency.

The council operates a with directly elected Mayor of Middlesbrough. The political composition of the council, as of the May 2019 local election, is Independent 23, Labour 20; and Conservative 3.

Teesside International Airport (formerly known as Durham Tees Valley Airport), is joint owned by the borough and the other four Tees Valley councils The council also owns multiple buildings in the borough.

Mayor

The first Mayor of Middlesbrough was the German-born Henry Bolckow in 1853. In the 20th century, encompassing introduction of universal suffrage in 1918 and changes in local government in the United Kingdom, the role of mayor changed and became largely ceremonial.

In 2001, as part of a wider programme of devolution, voters in Middlesbrough were offered a referendum to decide between a directly elected mayor or the cabinet system then in operation, with the traditional civic and ceremonial functions of the Mayors being transferred to the Chair of Middlesbrough Council, which they did so by a large margin.

In 2002, Ray Mallon (Independent), formerly a senior officer in Cleveland Police, became Middlesbrough's first directly elected mayor. He was re-elected in 2007 and then in 2011. Mallon chose not to stand for a fourth term in 2015 and his deputy mayor, Dave Budd (Labour) was elected to succeed him. Budd decided not to stand for a second term and in the May 2019 mayoral election, local businessman Andy Preston (independent) won with 59% of the vote.

Demography

Borough

Women in the former Middlehaven ward (absorbed into the central ward) had the second lowest life expectancy at birth, 74 years, of any ward in England and Wales in 2016.

In the borough of Middlesbrough, 14.0% of the population were non-white British. This makes the town about as ethnically diverse as Exeter. Additionally, it has a lower indigenous population than Gateshead and South Shields which are further north on the other side of County Durham but now in Tyne and Wear although historically within County Durham. It is also the second most ethnically diverse settlement in the North East (after Newcastle).

Built-up area sub-division
The wider Middlesbrough built-up area sub-division had a population of 174,700 according to the 2011 census. The suburbs which make up the area known as Greater Eston, which in eastern Redcar and Cleveland are often considered part of Middlesbrough outside of the borough.

Economy

This is a chart of trend of regional gross value added of Middlesbrough at current basic prices published (pp. 240–253) by Office for National Statistics with figures in millions of British Pounds Sterling.

 includes hunting and forestry

 includes energy and construction

 includes financial intermediation services indirectly measured

 Components may not sum to totals due to rounding

Freedom of the Borough
The following people and military units have received the Freedom of the Borough of Middlesbrough.

Individuals
 Councillor Joseph Calvert : 7 November 1919.
 L. Taylor – 30 March 1967 (deceased 23 May 1983)
 Right Rev. Monsignor Canon M O'Sullivan – 26 March 1968 (deceased 6 May 1978)
 Mrs Mary A. Daniel – 16 October 1974 (deceased 23 December 1983)
 Mrs Ethel A. Gaunt – 16 October 1974 (deceased 10 June 1990)
 Rt. Hon. Lord Bottomley  of Middlesbrough in the County of Cleveland – 21 December 1976 (deceased 3 November 1995)
 Councillor Mr E. A. Dickinson MBE – 8 May 1981 (deceased 2001)
 Mrs Rose M. Haston – 9 May 1986 (deceased 22 January 1991)
 Councillor Mr Arthur Pearson CBE – 9 May 1986 (deceased 23 February 1997)
 Councillor Mr Robert I. Smith – 9 May 1986 (deceased 23 February 1993)
 Councillor W. Ferrier MBE – 16 June 1992 (deceased 4 March 2015)
 Councillor Miss G. Popple – 16 June 1992 (deceased 10 May 2003)
 Councillor Mr Len Poole BEM JP – 16 June 1992 (deceased 15 May 2011)
 Mr John Robert Foster OBE – 8 March 1996
 Alma Collin MBE – 15 March 2000 (deceased 2014)
 Councillor Mrs Hazel Pearson OBE – 3 December 2003 (deceased 5 February 2016)
 Mr Steve Gibson – 18 March 2004
 Mr Jack Hatfield – 30 June 2009 (deceased January 2014)
 Mr Mackenzie Thorpe – 11 April 2019
 Gareth Southgate  - 28 July 2021.

Military units
 The Green Howards: 13 May 1944, transferred to the Yorkshire Regiment: 25 October 2006.
 The 34th (Northern) Signal Regiment (Volunteers): 29 April 1972.
 , RN: 15 March 2000.

References

External links
 https://www.middlesbrough.gov.uk/open-data-foi-and-have-your-say/about-middlesbrough-and-local-statistics/ward-profiles
 https://www.middlesbrough.gov.uk/
 http://www.thisismiddlesbrough.com/local/Contact_Middlesbrough_Council.asp
 https://www.lovemiddlesbrough.com/
 https://british-police-history.uk/f/middlesbrough-borough
 https://www.lgo.org.uk/your-councils-performance/middlesbrough-borough-council/statistics
 https://www.bbc.co.uk/news/topics/c5xyn3yw11kt/middlesbrough-borough-council
 http://www.200towns.co.uk/middlesbrough
 https://www.bbc.co.uk/news/uk-england-tees-48024370
 https://www.middlesbrough.gov.uk/mayor-council-and-councillors/civic-and-ceremonial/freedom-borough
 https://teesvalleynaturepartnership.org.uk/resources-2/natural-networks-opportunity-maps/middlesbrough-local-authority-area/
 https://www.routeyou.com/en-gb/location/toppoi/47411782/things-to-do-in-middlesbrough
 https://www.gazettelive.co.uk/news/teesside-news/calling-middlesbrough-city-not-slip-15795497

Video clips 
 https://www.youtube.com/user/middlesbroughcouncil

 
Local government districts of North Yorkshire
Unitary authority districts of England
Places in the Tees Valley
Local government districts of North East England
Boroughs in England